William Draper Box was a politician in Queensland, Australia. He was a Member of the Queensland Legislative Council.

Early life
William Draper Box was born in 1841 Walsall, Staffordshire, England, the son of Henry and Jane Box. He was educated in Melbourne. He came to Brisbane in 1862, aged 21, to establish a branch of his father's business, Henry Box and Son, which were saddlers, coachbuilders, ironmongers and importers.

Politics
William Box was appointed to the Queensland Legislative Council on 2 January 1874. Being a lifetime appointment, he held it until his death on 26 January 1904.

Later life
William Box died on 26 January 1904 in Hobart, Tasmania and was buried in Cornelian Bay Cemetery.

Legacy
His residence Baroona at Paddington is listed on the Queensland Heritage Register.

References

Members of the Queensland Legislative Council
People from Walsall
1841 births
1904 deaths
19th-century Australian politicians
Burials in Tasmania